Constantineşti may refer to several villages:

 Constantineşti, Goteşti Commune, Cantemir district, Moldova
 Constantineşti, Râmnicelu Commune, Brăila County, Romania
 Constantineşti, in the town of Scorniceşti, Olt County, Romania